A HRG gyrocompass is a compass and instrument of navigation. It is the latest generation of maintenance-free instruments.

It uses a hemispherical resonant gyroscope, accelerometers and computers to compute true north. The HRG gyrocompass is a complete unit, which unlike a conventional compass, has no rotating or other moving parts. It has an outstanding reliability. Its operational Mean Time Between Failure (MTBF) values are improved over a Fiber Optic Gyrocompass and also conventional mechanical gyrocompass.

It is also immune to severe environmental conditions.

See also 

 Fibre optic gyrocompass
 Gyrocompass

References 

 http://www.raytheon-anschuetz.com/products-solutions/product-range/standard-30-mf-gyro-compass
 http://www.raytheon-anschuetz.com/product-range/product-detail/69/Horizon-MF-Gyro-Compass-%28HRG%29
 http://www.sagem.com/media/20121024_bluenautetm-revolution-maritime-navigation-has-been-waiting
 http://www.sagem.com/media/20150916_sagems-bluenaute-navigation-system-chosen-canadas-new-offshore-patrol-vessels
 http://www.sagem.com/media/20150729_us-coast-guard-chooses-sagems-bluenauter-navigation-system-modernize-its-medium-cutters
 https://www.shephardmedia.com/news/digital-battlespace/uscg-patrol-boat-gets-safrans-bluenaute-system/

Aircraft instruments
Aerospace engineering
Spacecraft components
Navigational equipment
Navigational aids
Avionics